HK Slovan Gelnica is an ice hockey team playing in the Slovak 2.Liga. They play in the city of Gelnica, Slovakia at Zimný štadión Petra Bindasa.

References

External links
Supporters web site (Slovak)
 

Sport in Košice Region
Gelnica
1949 establishments in Slovakia
Ice hockey clubs established in 1949